A solar power station may either concentrate sunlight to make steam, or may use solar panels to directly generate electricity. The following articles contain lists of solar power stations:

 List of solar thermal power stations
 List of photovoltaic power stations
 List of largest power stations

Lists of engineering lists
Solar